Formica dirksi is a species of ant in the genus Formica. It is native to the United States.

References

External links

dirksi
Hymenoptera of North America
Insects of the United States
Insects described in 1949
Taxonomy articles created by Polbot